Ivan Alekseevich Likhachev (June 15, 1896 —  June 24, 1956) was a Soviet statesman, one of the organizers of the Soviet automobile industry. He is known as the director of the Moscow 1st State Automobile Plant (now the Likhachev Plant). Member of the Central Executive Committee of the USSR of the 7th convocation, deputy of the Supreme Soviet of the USSR of 1-5 convocations. Member of the Central Committee of the CPSU (b) (1939-1941), candidate member of the Central Committee of the CPSU (1956).

References 

1896 births
People from Venyovsky District
1956 deaths
Burials at the Kremlin Wall Necropolis
Recipients of the Order of Lenin
Recipients of the Order of the Red Banner of Labour
Stalin Prize winners
First convocation members of the Soviet of the Union
Second convocation members of the Soviet of the Union
Third convocation members of the Soviet of the Union
Fourth convocation members of the Soviet of the Union
Central Committee of the Communist Party of the Soviet Union members
People's commissars and ministers of the Soviet Union
Cheka officers
Soviet mechanical engineers
Russian Social Democratic Labour Party members